Roy Speckhardt (born January 24, 1973 in Carmel, New York) is the Development Director for VoteRiders. He is also the former executive director of the American Humanist Association, a non-profit civil liberties organization in Washington DC. In April 2021, he authored Justice-Centered Humanism via Pitchstone Press and in July 2015, he authored Creating Change Through Humanism via Humanist Press.

Biography
Speckhardt earned a Bachelor of Arts in sociology from Mary Washington College and a Master of Business Administration, with a concentration in information systems management, from George Mason University. In addition to his college education, he received specialized training in nonprofit tax law, financial management, grassroots organizing, fundraising, and dispute resolution.

Early in his career, Speckhardt was a fundraiser for various causes, including AIDS research and wildlife conservation, and worked on the "World Difference Campaign" of the Anti-Defamation League.  He worked for The Interfaith Alliance from 1995 to 2001 as deputy director in charge of staff. Speckhardt worked as the director of membership and programs of the American Humanist Association for four years, is executive director. The American Humanist Association is the oldest and one of the largest groups of humanists and atheists in the United States.

Challenges to "Pledge of Allegiance" 
In 2013 Speckhardt argued that the phrase "under God" in the Pledge of Allegiance violates the Equal Protection Amendment of the Massachusetts Constitution. In May 2014 the Supreme Judicial Court of Massachusetts ruled that the pledge was a "fundamentally patriotic exercise, not a religious one".

In 2014, the AHA likewise brought suit against the state of New Jersey. In February 2015 a New Jersey Superior Court Judge dismissed a lawsuit challenging the Pledge of Allegiance, ruling that "...the Pledge of Allegiance does not violate the rights of those who don't believe in God and does not have to be removed from the patriotic message."

Other activities
Speckhardt serves on the board of directors of the Humanist Institute and the advisory board of the Religious Freedom Center of the Newseum Institute.

Speckhardt has appeared on CNN Headline News, Fox News' Fox and Friends, Good Morning America, and National Public Radio. He currently writes a regular column for The Huffington Post and Patheos.

Notes

External links
Speckhardt's column on Patheos.
December 28, 2012 America mirrors global godless trend, a Guest Voices blog on the Washington Post.
Finding Faith in Humankind article in March/April 2010 issue of the Futurist.

American activists
American humanists
People from Fredericksburg, Virginia
University of Mary Washington alumni
Living people
1973 births
Secular humanists